Comporté may refer to:

People with the surname
 Philippe Gaultier de Comporté (1641-1687), lieutenant of the Carignan-Salières Regiment that arrived at the city of Quebec in 1665

Toponyms
 Comporté, a locality, near Poitiers, in the Center-West of France
 Pourvoirie de Comporté (Outfitter de Comporté), an outfitter located north of the town of La Malbaie, on the edge of Lake Comporté
 Comporté River, a tributary of the Malbaie River flowing into La Malbaie in the Eastern part of Charlevoix Regional County Municipality, Quebec, Canada
 Seigneurie Comporté, seigneury in Quebec, Canada